John McEnroe was the defending champion, but did not participate this year.

Ivan Lendl won the title when Tim Mayotte withdrew prior to the final.

Seeds

Draw

Finals

Top half

Section 1

Section 2

Bottom half

Section 3

Section 4

References

 Main Draw

U.S. Pro Indoor
1986 Grand Prix (tennis)